The 2022 North Dakota Fighting Hawks football team represented the University of North Dakota as a member of the Missouri Valley Football Conference (MVFC) during the 2022 NCAA Division I FCS football season. Led by ninth-year head coach Bubba Schweigert, the  Fighting Hawks compiling an overall record of 7–5 with a mark of 5–3 in conference play, placing in a three-way tie for third in the MVFC. North Dakota received an at-large bid to the NCAA Division I Football Championship playoff, losing to Weber State in the first round. The team played home games at Alerus Center in Grand Forks, North Dakota.

Schedule

References

North Dakota
North Dakota Fighting Hawks football seasons
North Dakota Fighting Hawks football
North Dakota